Nesel or Nasl may refer to:
 Nasl, Kurdistan
 Nesel, Mazandaran
 Nesel, alternate name of Neshel, Mazandaran Province